Bhootnath Road area is a neighborhood and residential area in Patna. The area is served by Agamkuan Police Station under Patna Police and Bahadurpur Housing Colony Post Office. This road is a State Highway and also act as a linking road between Patna Main Road (National Highway) and Bypass Road.  So this make this road one of the busiest road of Patna. TV Tower of Patna is located near this Road.

Transport and Connectivity
Bhootnath Road area is well connected to the main areas of Patna by minibuses. Auto-rickshaw and cycle rickshaw are available at most times, although other than mandatory hours. Nearest upcoming metro station under Patna Metro :- 
Bhootnath Road (2nd route 1st phase) 

Rajendra Nagar Terminal, one of the city's important railway stations and Gulzarbagh railway station, Patna's busiest station, are each located 2 kilometers away from different ends of the Bhootnath Road area.
Patna Airport is located about 12 km from the Bhootnath More.

Major landmarks
NMCH
Super 30
Litera Valley School

Localities
Famous areas in Bhootnath road include:
 Kumhrar
 Mundrikayan

Education institutions
In the past decade, the Bazar Samiti area has emerged as a popular coaching destination for competitive exams preparation, which is near to bhootnath road. The area attracts thousands of students every year from its state and other neighbouring states to prepare primarily for the IIT-JEE. Super 30, Asia's one of the top institute is located near bhootnath road.

 Litera Valley School
 Dr. G.L. Dutta D.A.V. Public School, Transport Nagar
 St. Joseph's High School, Patna
 Nalanda Medical College and Hospital
 Alokit Public School
 Shivam Convent 
 Sindu Public School

See also
 Kumhrar
 Kankarbagh

References

Neighbourhoods in Patna